Koloocheh or Kleicha (Persian: کلوچه), also known as Persian New Year Bread, is a Persian stamped cookie or bread, originating in various parts of Iran. There are many variations on the recipe (bready-texture vs. crispy; and stuffed vs. unstuffed) which spans from the Arabian Peninsula to various diaspora communities including in Eastern Europe, and North America.

About 
Typically koloocheh are cookies filled with dates and walnuts, but can be stuffed with grated coconut and additionally spiced with saffron, rose water, cardamom, cinnamon, or citrus zest. The recipe for Caspian cuisine-style bready koloocheh cookie can be made vegan by replacing butter with coconut oil.

It is a recipe made by Persian Jews during the holiday Purim; by Christians during Easter; and Muslims during Ramadan. For Norooz (English: Persian New Year), Iranians will make a koloocheh bread. Koloocheh cookies from Southern Iran are brittle biscuits that principally consists of water, sugar, wheat flour and egg white.

Etymology 
From Middle Persian [Book Pahlavi needed] (kwlʾck' /kulāčag/, “small, round bun”)

See also
 Kolompeh
 Ma'amoul
 Murabbalı mecidiye

References

Cookies
Culture in Shiraz
Iranian pastries
Iraqi cuisine
Saudi Arabian cuisine
Talysh cuisine
Vegan cuisine